Louis Mihajlovich (February 19, 1925 – December 11, 1994) is a former defensive end in the National Football League.

Biography
Mihajlovich was born on February 19, 1925, in Detroit, Michigan.

Career
Mihajlovich's first professional experience was with the Los Angeles Dons of the All-America Football Conference. Later he played with the Green Bay Packers during the 1954 NFL season.

He played at the collegiate level at Indiana University.

See also
List of Green Bay Packers players

References

1925 births
1994 deaths
Players of American football from Detroit
Green Bay Packers players
Los Angeles Dons players
American football defensive ends
Indiana Hoosiers football players